Michael Anthony Gray (born 25 July 1966), better known as Michael Gray, is a British DJ and house music producer. He is also half of the dance music production and remixing duo Full Intention.

Biography
Michael Gray created a megamix entitled "The Brits 1990 (Dance Medley)" for that year's awards ceremony which peaked at #2 in the UK Singles Chart.  In 2004, he began issuing records under his own name, the first being "The Weekend", a worldwide hit in late that year. It peaked at #7 in the UK Singles Chart when licensed through UMTV on Eye Industries, and also notched up over 20,000 plays on the radio. In the United States, "The Weekend" was a Top 10 hit on Billboard's Hot Dance Airplay chart in 2005, where it was released on Ultra Records. It featured in a Honda commercial and also in the Ugly Betty episode, "Sofia's Choice", in 2007.

The follow-up to "The Weekend" was "Borderline" featuring vocals from Shelly Poole, formerly of Alisha's Attic, released on 24 July 2006. The track peaked at #3 on the ARIA Club Chart and at #12 on the UK Singles Chart. In 2007, an album, Analog Is On, was released briefly only in Japan. A third single, "Somewhere Beyond", peaked at #5 on the Australian ARIA Club Chart.

Gray's 2000s productions include: Full Intention's "I Believe In You" (2005), 'Hi Fashion' with Maria Lawson, "Whatcha Gonna Do" (2005). 'Miami Ice' "Better Than Perfect" (2005), 'Robot Man' "Ready for This" featuring Nanchang Nancy (2008). "Ready for This" was #5 on the UK Club Chart, and #1 on the UK Upfront Club Chart. In 2009, with the new label Full Intention Records, he released Full Intention's "Once In A Lifetime", "I Will Follow" and "Forever".

His early 2010s productions include: Michael Gray, Paul Harris, Kid Massive & Sam Obernik 'Home' (2010), Michael Gray, Paul Harris & Jon Pearn feat. Amanda Wilson "Caught up" (2010), Michael Gray, Jon Pearn, Rob Roar & Cassandra Fox 'Lights Down Low'. (2010). In 2010, Gray appeared at Belgrade Arena DJing alongside David Guetta. In late 2010, Michael Gray made a remix of the song "It's OK" by Cee Lo Green. In 2011, he released a single called "Remember" with Marco Lys. In 2013, he released another single with Marco Lys called "The Underground". In 2013, he released under the name MGNY a single called "My World" featuring the vocalist NY.

With Full Intention, the most popular tracks he released recently were "Keep Pushing" in 2016 and "I Miss You" in 2017. In 2016, Michael Gray released new versions of his hit "Walk Into The Sun", notably with a Full Intention remix. In 2018, Full Intention made a remix of a David Penn's song featuring Lisa Millett entitled "Join Us". In 2018, Michael Gray released a single entitled "Keep Moving On", featuring the vocalists Kimberley Brown and Shirley Marie Graham. In 2019, he released the tracks "24 7 People", "Take Me Back" and "Brother Brother". The same year, his remix of Sylvester's hit "You Make Me Feel (Mighty Real)" was real success on the charts and was played by many DJs in clubs and concerts.

In 2020, Michael Gray released a new "Sultra Mix" of his famous song "The Weekend". The same year, he worked with the vocalist RoRoe to produce a track called "The One", released on Sultra Records. In September 2020, he released a track called "The Sun" with The Melody Men. Michael Gray was ranked #1 at the  "Top Artists Of 2020" by Traxsouce.

Michael Gray played DJ sets in many countries, notably in Poland, Germany, The Philippines, Australia, Russia, Brazil, Georgia, Spain and The Netherlands.

Discography

Studio albums
 Analog Is On (2007)

Singles

Selected remixes 
 2004 Scape featuring D´Empress - Be My Friend (Michael Gray Remix)
 2005 Yanou - Sun Is Shining (Michael Gray Remix)
 2007 Splittr - All Alone (Michael Gray Remix)
 2008 Seamus Haji, Lords Of Flatbush - 24 Hours (Michael Gray Remix)
 2008 Cicada - Beautiful (Michael Gray Remix)
 2008 Priors - What You Need (Michael Gray Remix)
 2008 Danism - Strike (Michael Gray Remix)
 2009 Kläder & Vapen Featuring Anna Ternheim – What Have I Done (Michael Gray Remix)
 2009 Gary Go - Open Arms (Michael Gray Remix)
 2009 Visage - Fade to Grey (Michael Gray Remix)
 2010 Izzy Stardust and Dumb Dan - Looking Out For A Bigger Love (Michael Gray Remix) 
 2010 Valeriya - All That I Want (Michael Gray Remix)
 2010 Cee Lo Green - It's OK (Michael Gray Remix)
 2011 Sterling Void - Runaway Girl (Michael Gray Remix)
 2012 Tara McDonald - Give Me More (Michael Gray Remix)
 2013 Kamaliya - Love Me Like (Michael Gray Remix)
 2015 Electronic Youth - Be Right There (Michael Gray Remix) 
 2019 Advance - Take Me To The Top (Michael Gray Remix)
 2019 Sylvester - You Make Me Feel (Mighty Real)  (Michael Gray Remix)
 2019 Alton Edwards - I Just Wanna (Spend Some Time with You)  (Michael Gray Remix) 
 2019 Mahogany - Ride On The Rhythm (Michael Gray Remix)
 2019 Raw Silk - Just In Time (Michael Gray Remix)
 2019 Billy Porter - Love Yourself (Michael Gray Club Remix)
 2019 Husky, Brazen - Only One Way (Michael Gray Remix)
 2019 Karen Harding and Who - I Don't Need Love (Mark Knight and Michael Gray Remix)
 2020 Bobby D'Ambrosio featuring Lasala - Runaway Love (Michael Gray Remix)
 2020 Jasper Street Co. - Paradise (Mark Knight & Michael Gray Remix)
 2020 Glen Horsborough & IDA fLO - Switched On (Michael Gray Remix)
 2020 Chevals - Thank You For The Ride (Michael Gray Remix)
 2020 World Premiere - Share The Night (Michael Gray Remix)  
 2020 Vicky D - The Beat Is Mine (Michael Gray Remix)
 2020 Homero Espinosa feat. Tobirus Mozelle - Love Is The Cure (Michael Gray Remix)
 2020 Serious Intentions - You Don't Know (Michael Gray Remix)
 2020 Chanelle, Eric Kupper - One Man (Michael Gray Remix)
 2020 Anané - Get On The Funk Train (Michael Gray & Mark Knight Mix)
 2020 Lou Casablanca - Move With The Beat (Michael Gray Remix)
 2020 Kelli Sae - Good Love (Michael Gray Extended Mix) 
 2020 Hi Voltage - Lets Get Horny (Michael Gray Remix)
 2021 Supakings - Back and Forth (Michael Gray Remix)
 2021 Raze - Break 4 Love (Michael Gray Remix)
 2021 Cultural Vibe - Ma Foom Bey (Michael Gray Remix)
 2021 Brian Power - Optimistic (feat. Lucita Jules) (Michael Gray Remix)
 2021 The S.O.S Band - Just Get Ready (Michael Gray Remix)
 2021 Ingram - D.J.'s Delight (Mark Knight & Michael Gray Extended)

References

1966 births
Living people
DJs from London
English record producers
English dance musicians
English house musicians
Club DJs
Remixers
People from Croydon
Electronic dance music DJs